Dr.Sikander Kumar is an India politician of Bharatiya Janata Party (BJP)  of Himachal pradesh. He is a Member of Parliament in the Rajya Sabha, the upper house of Indian Parliament from Himachal Pradesh as a member of the  BJP. He was a 26th Vice Chancellor of Himachal Pradesh University Shimla.

Political career
He has been declared by the BJP as its candidate from Himachal Pradesh for the 2022 Rajya Sabha elections. On 22 March 2022 He was elected unopposed to the Rajya Sabha from Himachal Pradesh on BJP ticket.

References

Living people
People from Hamirpur, Himachal Pradesh
Bharatiya Janata Party politicians from Himachal Pradesh
Rajya Sabha members from Himachal Pradesh
Year of birth missing (living people)